Southern Administrative Okrug, or Yuzhny Administrative Okrug, is one of the twelve high-level territorial divisions (administrative okrugs) of the federal city of Moscow, Russia. As of the 2010 Census, its population was 1,716,808, up from 1,593,065 recorded during the 2002 Census.

History
The territory that comprises modern Southern Administrative Okrug attracted settlers from time immemorial, even in spite of the fact that it had historically been an unsafe area. In order to protect the borders, powerful monasteries were built. The first one was the Danilov Monastery, founded in 1271 by Prince Daniel of Moscow.

In 1593, the Donskoy Monastery was established to commemorate the victory over Khan Kazi-Girey. Villages appeared and grew near the monastery. Kolomna was one of the first villages to appear in the area. Urban development of the area began in the 16th–17th centuries, at which time the Kolomenskoye architectural ensemble was also built. The Ascension Church in particular is listed by the UNESCO as a World Heritage Site.

Territorial divisions
The administrative okrug comprises the following sixteen districts:
Biryulyovo Vostochnoye
Biryulyovo Zapadnoye
Brateyevo
Chertanovo Severnoye
Chertanovo Tsentralnoye
Chertanovo Yuzhnoye
Danilovsky
Donskoy
Moskvorechye-Saburovo
Nagatino-Sadovniki
Nagatinsky zaton
Nagorny
Orekhovo-Borisovo Severnoye
Orekhovo-Borisovo Yuzhnoye
Tsaritsyno
Zyablikovo

References

Notes

Sources

 
Administrative okrugs of Moscow